The 1996 Croatian Indoors was a men's tennis tournament played on indoor carpet courts at the Dom Sportova in Zagreb, Croatia and was part of the World Series of the 1996 ATP Tour. It was the inaugural edition of the tournament and was held from 29 January through 4 February 1996. First-seeded Goran Ivanišević won the singles title.

Finals

Singles

 Goran Ivanišević defeated  Cédric Pioline 3–6, 6–3, 6–2
 It was Ivanišević's 1st title of the year and the 19th of his career.

Doubles

 Menno Oosting /  Libor Pimek defeated  Martin Damm /  Hendrik Jan Davids 6–3, 7–6
 It was Oosting's only title of the year and the 6th of his career. It was Pimek's 1st title of the year and the 14th of his career.

External links
 Official website
 ATP Tournament Profile

Croatian Indoors
Zagreb Indoors
1990s in Zagreb
1996 in Croatian tennis
January 1996 sports events in Europe
February 1996 sports events in Europe